Encephalartos cupidus is a species of cycad that is found in the Limpopo Province, South Africa at elevations of 700 up to 1,500.

Description
It is an acaulic plant, with a partially underground stem, without branches, 15–40 cm tall and 20–30 cm in diameter; secondary stems can originate from shoots that arise at the base of the main stem. 

The pinnate leaves, arranged in a crown at the apex of the stem, up to 100 cm long, are composed of lanceolate leaflets, with margins equipped with small spines and arranged on the rachis at an angle of 50-100°.

It is a dioecious species, endowed with solitary male cones, fusiform, pedunculated, of apple green color, 18–30 cm long and with a diameter of 5–8 cm, with broad and rhombic microsporophylls, and female, ovoid cones, in solitary genus but rarely in pairs, 20–30 cm long and with a diameter of 15–20 cm, with macrosporophylls with a warty surface.

The seeds have an ovoid shape, are 25–35 mm long, have a width of 15–20 mm and are covered with an apricot-colored sarcotesta.

References

External links
 
 

cupidus
Flora of the Northern Provinces